Jan Kokla (born 29 May 1997) is an Estonian former professional footballer who played as a defensive midfielder.

Club career
Kokla started playing football with Andres Oper's Academy before moving to Nõmme United. In 2014, he signed for Meistriliiga club Flora, spending the 2014 season in the reserve team Flora II. Kokla made his debut in the Meistriliiga on 13 July 2015, in a 4–0 away win against Tulevik, playing the full 90 minutes and picking up a yellow card. He retired from football in 2017 due to mononucleosis.

International career
Kokla started his international youth career in 2012 with the Estonia U16 team and has captained the Estonia U19 team. He earned his first senior cap for Estonia on 1 June 2016, in a 2–0 friendly home win against Andorra, making a good first impression by producing an assist to opening goal scored by Dmitri Kruglov.

Honours

Club
Flora
Estonian Cup: 2015–16
Estonian Supercup: 2016

References

External links

1997 births
Living people
Footballers from Tallinn
Estonian footballers
FC Flora players
Estonia international footballers
Association football midfielders
FC Nõmme United players